Phylliroe bucephala is a parasitic species of pelagic nudibranch, a marine gastropod mollusc in the family Phylliroidae.

Biology
This species of nudibranch is transparent with its guts visible through the laterally flattened body. It has a tail and two long smooth rhinophores. It feeds on jellyfish and plankton as an adult. The juveniles parasitize Zanclea medusae.

References

 Powell A. W. B., New Zealand Mollusca, William Collins Publishers Ltd, Auckland, New Zealand 1979 
 SeaSlugForum

Phylliroidae
Gastropods described in 1810